John Eric Nash (born 16 April 1950) is an Australian former cricketer and Australian rules footballer, playing 51 first-class and seven List A matches for South Australia between 1970 and 1981 and 22 games between 1969 and 1972 for Norwood Football Club  in the South Australian National Football League.

During the late 1970s, when many of Australia's top cricketers were playing in World Series Cricket, Nash was considered a possibility to make the Australian side, yet by 1981 Nash's form had fallen away to the point he had been relegated to Sturt Cricket Club's B side.

Nash's son Jay Nash was a South Australian cricket youth representative.

See also
 List of South Australian representative cricketers

References

External links
 

1950 births
Living people
Australian cricketers
South Australia cricketers
Cricketers from Adelaide
Norwood Football Club players